Father & Son is a four-part Irish television crime thriller produced by Left Bank Pictures and Octagon Films.
The series was broadcast in the Republic of Ireland on RTÉ One and in the United Kingdom on ITV.

Written by Frank Deasy, the serial depicts the return of Michael O'Connor (played by Dougray Scott) to his native Ireland, after spending several years imprisoned in the United Kingdom. A parallel storyline follows O'Connor's son and sister-in-law in Manchester. The serial was filmed entirely on location in Dublin and Wicklow from October to December 2008, with only minimal second-unit filming in Manchester. Father & Son was first broadcast on RTÉ One in June 2009 and has since received positive reaction from the Irish press. It was broadcast in the UK on the ITV network during June 2010.

Plot
The series focuses on inner city crime life in both the United Kingdom and Ireland. Ex-criminal Michael O'Connor (Dougray Scott) comes back to Ireland to live with his new pregnant partner Anna, free from his past life of crime. Michael was arrested and spent years in prison, leaving his wife Lynne and son Séan (Reece Noi) on their own. Three days later his wife Lynne was murdered, leaving Michael devastated, and he quickly turns his back on crime. He returns to Ireland, leaving his son Séan behind in the care of Lynne's sister Connie. Connie and Séan live in a gang-ridden Manchester suburb. Séan distances himself from the gangs, and their culture of violence. But it's not long until gang leader Jacob King (Dwayne Scantlebury) disturbs the peace. However, with the unfolding of unexpected events, Séan is arrested for a murder which he did not commit, and is imprisoned. These events lead his father Michael back to Manchester to help free his son from prison. Manchester, however brings back painful memories for Michael, as it was here his wife was murdered, and comes to terms that his past involvement in crime resulted in Lynne's death.

Cast
 Dougray Scott as Michael O'Connor
 Sophie Okenedo as Connie Turner
 Ian Hart as D.I. Tony Conroy
 Stephen Rea as Augustine Flynn
 Reece Noi as Sean O'Connor
 Wunmi Mosaku as Stacey Cox
 Simon Delaney as George Harper
 John Cavanagh as John O'Connor
 Terence Maynard as Barrington
 Imani McLaren as Imani Turner
 Flora Montgomery as Anna Caplan
 Darren Morfitt as Blanchflower
 Philip Arditti as Suliman
 Michael McElhatton as D.S. Norman McGinty
 David Wilmot as D.S. Declan Henderson
 Dwayne Scantlebury as Jacob King

Episodes

Production
Frank Deasy was inspired to write Father & Son (under the working title The Return) after considering how decisions he made when he was young shaped the lives of his three children. From that, he developed the character of Michael O'Connor. He also acknowledged how money laundering and investment is relevant to Ireland and wanted to explore how Irish people have "disappeared" into Britain. Deasy compared the premise of Father & Son to his previous television serial The Passion, calling Father & Son "a reverse telling"; "it's the story of a father prepared to sacrifice himself for his son, to cleanse his son's sins, as it were."

British network ITV commissioned Deasy's script but were unable to fund the entire series, so approached Irish broadcaster RTÉ and the Irish Film Board for additional funding. Tax breaks available to television production in Ireland made it cheaper to film outside of Britain. Production, by Left Bank Pictures, was based in Crumlin. Open casting calls for background actors were held on 2 and 3 October at Liberty Hall. Filming ran over 52 days from 13 October to 13 December 2008. Two days were spent filming in Manchester for establishing shots. Location filming took place along the Dublin quays and in Wicklow. The production was the first time director Brian Kirk and producer Michael Casey had used the Red One digital camera. Production of the series in Dublin and Wicklow generated €5 million for the local economy.

Broadcast and reception
Following Episode 1, Donald Clarke for The Irish Times compared Father & Son to the American drama series The Wire, complimenting the opening titles and "its ability to tie together a multitude of apparently unconnected stories". However, he was concerned that the level of realism created by the writing and directing was spoilt by filming the Manchester-set scenes in Dublin: "Deasy appears to have something important and specific to say about gang culture in Manchester, but, filmed largely in Dublin, the series cannot hope to breathe genuine Mancunian air [...] the average Dublin viewer, having spotted familiar roofs and corners, will find his credulity stretched to breaking point." In the Evening Herald, Pat Stacey praised the actors, particularly Dougray Scott, and compared the series to "the kind of stuff writers such as Trevor Preston and the Kennedy Martin brothers, Troy and Ian, used to turn out for ITV in the 70s and early-80s, but with an added edge of social realism." Stacey continued his praise, calling Episode 2 "a fantastically well-crafted thriller that shows no sign of letting up".

The Irish Playwrights and Screenwriters Guild posthumously presented Deasy with the ZeBBie Award for Best Television Script for Episode 1. At the 7th Irish Film and Television Awards, Deasy won the award for Best Television Script, Stephen Rea won Best Actor in a Supporting Role, and the serial was nominated in the Best Single Drama/Drama Serial category, but lost to Five Minutes of Heaven.

ITV broadcast the serial in the UK from 7 to 10 June 2010.

References

Further reading
Kirk, Brian (27 May 2010). "On location: Father & Son, ITV1" (subscription access). Broadcastnow.co.uk (Emap Media). Retrieved on 31 May 2010.

External links
 Father & Son at RTÉ.ie
 Father & Son at itv.com
 Father & Son at Left Bank Pictures
 

2009 British television series debuts
2009 British television series endings
2000s British crime television series
British crime television series
British television miniseries
English-language television shows
Irish crime television series
Irish drama television series
RTÉ original programming
Television series by Left Bank Pictures
Television shows set in Manchester
Television shows set in the Republic of Ireland
2009 Irish television series debuts
2009 Irish television series endings
2000s British drama television series